Joe Dickson (1940-April 6, 2022) was a former politician in Ontario, Canada. He was a Liberal member of the Legislative Assembly of Ontario from 2007 to 2018 who represented the riding of Ajax—Pickering.

Background
Dickson was born and raised in Ajax, Ontario. He was the owner of a printing business, Dickson Printing Ltd.  Dickson was a recipient of the Queen Elizabeth II Golden Jubilee Medal and the Queen Elizabeth II Diamond Jubilee Medal. He supports 22 Ajax-Pickering area sports teams. He lived in Ajax with his wife Donna. They have two adult children and five grandchildren. He died April 7, 2022.

Politics
Dickson began his career and community involvement as a trustee of the local Catholic District School Board. Dickson was a councillor for the town of Ajax, Ontario from 1983 to 1990 and then from 1992-2006. He also served as a regional councillor for Durham. and also served as a trustee on the Ajax Catholic School Board.

Dickson ran for the Liberal Party in the 1995 election in the riding of Durham West but lost to Janet Ecker by 15,258 votes.

In the 2007 provincial election he ran for the Liberals again in the  candidate in the riding of Ajax—Pickering. He defeated Progressive Conservative candidate Kevin Ashe by 5,959 votes. He was re-elected in 2011 and 2014.

Dickson served as a deputy government whip from 2007 to 2011. In September 2013, he was appointed as parliamentary assistant to the Minister of Citizenship and Immigration and he served in that capacity until the Legislature was dissolved May 2, 2014. In July 2014 he was appointed Parliamentary Assistant to the Minister of Northern Development and Mines.

In the 2018 provincial election he ran in the redistributed riding of Ajax. He came in third behind Progressive Conservative winner Rod Phillips and runner-up New Democrat Monique Hughes.

Electoral record

References

External links

1940 births
Living people
21st-century Canadian politicians
Businesspeople from Ontario
Ontario Liberal Party MPPs
Ontario municipal councillors
Ontario school board trustees
People from Ajax, Ontario